Paul Howell (born 10 January 1960) is a British Conservative Party politician serving as Member of Parliament (MP) for Sedgefield since 2019. Prior to his political career, he was an accountant.

Early life and career
Howell was born in Bishop Auckland Hospital in County Durham. He was raised in Ferryhill and Newton Aycliffe and attended Dean Bank and Sugar Hill primary schools and The Avenue Comprehensive School. His father was a divisional fire officer. After leaving school, he worked as a chartered accountant for firms such as Darchem, Blue Circle Industries, and Wilsonart.

Political career
Howell joined the Conservative Party in 2010. He was a councillor for Hummersknott ward on the Darlington Borough Council between 2019 and 2021. He was also a councillor for Aycliffe North and Middridge on the Durham County Council between 2017 and 2021.

He was elected as MP for Sedgefield at the 2019 general election with a majority of 4,513 (10.9%). The constituency had previously been represented by a Labour Party MP since the 1935 general election including former PM Tony Blair who represented the constituency between 1983 and 2007. He had previously contested Houghton and Sunderland South seat as the Conservative candidate in the 2017 general election.

Howell has been a member of the Transport Select Committee since November 2022 and was a member of the Business, Energy and Industrial Strategy Committee between March 2020 and October 2022. On 14 June 2022, Howell became a Parliamentary Private Secretary in the Department for Environment, Food and Rural Affairs. 

On 15 November 2022, during an Opposition Day debate on ministerial severance pay, Howell accused Labour of scaremongering over the September 2022 mini-budget citing the greater economic impact of the COVID-19 pandemic and the 2022 Russian invasion of Ukraine, and argued that it was the decision of individuals on whether to take their severance payments. After Shadow Secretary of State for Levelling Up, Housing and Communities and Labour MP Lisa Nandy asked for his view on severance payments, Howell replied, "What do I think? I think it depends on the individual. The hon. Lady has chirped and talked... Do you want to hear, or do you want to shut up?", which left Nandy and fellow Labour MPs Sarah Owen and Paula Barker on the opposition frontbench shocked. He immediately apologised for his comments.

Personal life
Howell owns a property portfolio consisting of nine houses in Darlington, five houses in Durham and two flats in County Durham.

References

External links

1960 births
Living people
UK MPs 2019–present
Conservative Party (UK) MPs for English constituencies
People from Sedgefield